A mongrel, mutt or mixed-breed dog is a dog that does not belong to one officially recognized breed and including those that are the result of intentional breeding. Although the term mixed-breed dog is sometimes preferred, many mongrels have no known purebred ancestors. Crossbreed dogs, and "designer dogs", while also a mix of breeds, differ from mongrels in being intentionally bred. At other times, the word mongrel has been applied to informally purpose-bred dogs such as curs, which were created at least in part from mongrels, especially if the breed is not officially recognized.

Although mongrels are viewed as of less commercial value than intentionally bred dogs, they are thought to be less susceptible to genetic health problems associated with inbreeding (based on the theory of heterosis), and have enthusiasts and defenders who prefer them to intentionally bred dogs.

Estimates place the prevalence of mongrels at 150 million animals worldwide.

Terminology

Crossbreed vs. mongrel

In the United States, the term mixed-breed is a favored synonym over mongrel among individuals who wish to avoid negative connotations associated with the latter term. The implication that such dogs must be a mix of defined breeds may stem from an inverted understanding of the origins of dog breeds. Purebred dogs have been, for the most part, artificially created from random-bred populations by human selective breeding with the purpose of enhancing desired physical, behavioral, or temperamental characteristics. Dogs that are not purebred are not necessarily a mix of such defined breeds. Therefore, among some experts and fans of such dogs, mongrel is still the preferred term.

Dog crossbreeds, sometimes called designer dogs, also are not members of a single recognized breed. Unlike mixed-breeds, crossbreed dogs are often the product of artificial selection – intentionally created by humans, whereas the term mongrel specifically refers to dogs that develop by natural selection, without the planned intervention of humans.

Regional and slang terms

The words cur, tyke, mutt, and mongrel are used, sometimes in a derogatory manner. There are also regional terms for mixed-breed dogs. In the United Kingdom, mongrel is the unique technical word for a mixed-breed dog. North Americans generally prefer the term mix or mixed-breed. Mutt is also commonly used (in the United States and Canada). Some American registries and dog clubs that accept mixed-breed dogs use the breed description All American.

There are also names for mixed-breeds based on geography, behavior, or food. In Hawaii, mixes are referred to as poi dogs, although they are not related to the extinct Hawaiian Poi Dog. In the Bahamas and the Turks and Caicos Islands, the common term is potcake dogs (referring to the table scraps they are fed). In South Africa, the tongue-in-cheek expression pavement special is sometimes used as a description for a mixed-breed dog. In Trinidad and Tobago, these mixed dogs are referred to as pot hounds (pothong). In Serbia, a similar expression is prekoplotski avlijaner (over-the-fence yard-dweller). In the Philippines, mixed-breed street dogs are often called askal, a Tagalog-derived contraction of asong kalye (”street dog"). In Puerto Rico, they are known as satos; in Venezuela they are called yusos or cacris, the latter being a contraction of the words callejero criollo (literally, street creole, as street dogs are usually mongrels); and in Chile and Bolivia, they are called quiltros. In Costa Rica, it is common to hear the word zaguate, a term originating from a Nahuatl term, zahuatl, that refers to the disease called scabies. In the rural southern United States, a small hunting dog is known as a feist.

Slang terms are also common. Heinz 57, Heinz, or Heinz Hound is often used for dogs of uncertain ancestry, in a playful reference to the "57 Varieties" slogan of the H. J. Heinz Company. In some countries, such as Australia, bitsa (or bitzer) is sometimes used, meaning "bits o' this, bits o' that". In Brazil and the Dominican Republic, the name for mixed-breed dogs is vira-lata (trash-can tipper) because of homeless dogs who knock over trash cans to reach discarded food. In Newfoundland, a smaller mixed-breed dog is known as a cracky, hence the colloquial expression "saucy as a cracky" for someone with a sharp tongue.

Determining ancestry

Guessing a mixed-breed's ancestry can be difficult even for knowledgeable dog observers, because mixed-breeds have much more genetic variation than purebreds. For example, two black mixed-breed dogs might each have recessive genes that produce a blond coat and, therefore, produce offspring looking unlike their parents.

Starting in 2007, genetic analysis has become available to the public. The companies claim their DNA-based diagnostic test can genetically determine the breed composition of mixed-breed dogs. These tests are still limited in scope because only a small number of the hundreds of dog breeds have been validated against the tests, and because the same breed in different geographical areas may have different genetic profiles. The tests do not test for breed purity, but for genetic sequences that are common to certain breeds. With a mixed-breed dog, the test is not proof of purebred ancestry, but rather an indication that those dogs share common ancestry with certain purebreds. The American Kennel Club does not recognize the use of DNA tests to determine breed.

Many newer dog breeds can be traced back to a common foundational breed, making them difficult to separate genetically. For example, Labrador Retrievers, Flat-coated Retrievers, Chesapeake Bay Retrievers, and Newfoundland dogs share a common ancestry with the St. John's water dog – a now-extinct naturally occurring dog landrace from the island of Newfoundland.

Health

The theory of hybrid vigor suggests that as a group, dogs of varied ancestry will be generally healthier than their purebred counterparts. In purebred dogs, intentionally breeding dogs of very similar appearance over several generations produces animals that carry many of the same alleles, some of which are detrimental. If the founding population for the breed was small, then the genetic diversity of that particular breed may be small for quite some time. 

When humans select certain dogs for new breeds, they artificially isolate that group of genes and cause more copies of that gene to be made than might have otherwise occurred in nature. The population is initially more fragile because of the lack of genetic diversity. If the dog breed is popular, and the line continues, over hundreds of years diversity increase due to mutations and occasional out-breeding. This is why some of the very old breeds are more stable. One issue is when certain traits found in the breed standard are associated with genetic disorders. The artificial selective force favors the duplication of the genetic disorder because it comes with a desired physical trait. The genetic health of hybrids tends to be higher. Healthy traits have been lost in many purebred dog lines because many breeders of showdogs are more interested in conformation – the physical attributes of the dogs in relation to the breed standard – than in the health and working temperament for which the dog was originally bred.

Populations are vulnerable when the dogs bred are closely related. Inbreeding among purebreds has exposed various genetic health problems not always readily apparent in less uniform populations. Mixed-breed dogs are more genetically diverse due to the more haphazard nature of their parents' mating.  The offspring of such matings might be less likely to express certain genetic disorders because there might be a decreased chance that both parents carry the same detrimental recessive alleles, but some deleterious recessives occur across many seemingly unrelated breeds, and therefore merely mixing breeds is no guarantee of genetic health. When two poor specimens are bred, the offspring could inherit the worst traits of both parents. This is commonly seen in dogs that came from puppy mills.

Several studies have shown that mixed-breed dogs have a health advantage over purebred dogs. A German study finds that "mongrels require less veterinary treatment". Studies in Sweden have found that "Mongrel dogs are less prone to many diseases than the average purebred dog" and, when referring to death rates, that "mongrels were consistently in the low risk category". Data from Denmark also suggest that mixed breeds have greater longevity on average compared to purebreds.
 A British study showed similar results, but a few breeds (notably Jack Russell Terriers, Miniature Poodles and Whippets) lived longer than mixed breeds.

In one study, the effect of breed on longevity in the pet dog was analyzed using mortality data from 23,535 pet dogs. The data were obtained from North American veterinary teaching hospitals. The median age at death was determined for purebred and mixed-breed dogs of different body weights. Within each body weight category, the median age at death was lower for purebred dogs compared with mixed-breed dogs. The median age at death was "8.5 years for all mixed breed dogs, and 6.7 years for all pure breed dogs" in the study.

In 2013, a study found that mixed breeds live on average 1.2 years longer than purebreds, and that increasing body weight was negatively correlated with longevity (i.e. the heavier the dog, the shorter its lifespan). Another study published in 2019 confirmed this 1.2 year difference in lifespan for mixed-breed dogs, and further demonstrated negative impacts of recent inbreeding and benefits of occasional outcrossing for lifespan in individual dogs.

Studies that have been done in the area of health show that mixed-breeds on average are both healthier and longer-lived than their purebred relations. This is because current accepted breeding practices within the pedigreed dog community result in a reduction in genetic diversity, and can result in physical characteristics that lead to health issues.

Studies have shown that crossbreed dogs have a number of desirable reproductive traits. Scott and Fuller found that crossbreed dogs were superior mothers compared to purebred mothers, producing more milk and giving better care. These advantages led to a decreased mortality in the offspring of crossbreed dogs.

Types

Mongrel dogs can be divided roughly into types:

 Mixes that show characteristics of two or more breeds. A mix might have some purebred ancestors, or might come from a long line of mixed-breeds. These dogs are usually identified by the breed they most resemble, such as a "Lab mix" or "Collie-Shepherd", even if their ancestry is unknown.
 The generic pariah dog, or feral Canis lupus familiaris, where non-selective breeding has occurred over many generations. The term originally referred to the wild dogs of India, but now refers to dogs belonging to or descended from a population of wild or feral dogs. The Canaan Dog is an example of a recognized breed with pariah ancestry. Pariah dogs tend to be between yellow and light brown in color and of medium height and weight. This may represent the appearance of the modern dog's ancestor. DNA analysis has shown pariah dogs to have a more ancient gene pool than modern breeds.
 Functional breeds, which are purpose-bred dogs whose ancestors are not purebred, but rather are selected by their performance at particular tasks. Examples of this are the Alaskan husky, the Eurohound, and the Pointer/Greyhound mixes referred to as Greysters, which compete at skijoring and pulka races, particularly in Europe. Occasionally, a functional breed such as this becomes accepted as a breed over time.
Purebred dogs are known by breed names given to groups of dogs that are visibly similar in most characteristics and have reliable documented descent. In recent years many owners and breeders of crossbreed dogs identify them—often facetiously—by invented names constructed from parts of the parents' breed names. These are known as portmanteau names and the resulting crosses as "designer dogs". For example, a cross between a Pekingese and a Poodle may be referred to as a Pekeapoo. Other similarly named crossbreeds include the Goldendoodle, a cross between a Standard Poodle and a Golden Retriever, and the Dorgi, a cross between a Dachshund and a Welsh Corgi.

In dog sports

Until the early 1980s, mixed-breed dogs were usually excluded from obedience and other dog sport competitions. However, starting with the American Mixed Breed Obedience Registry (AMBOR) and the Mixed Breed Dog Clubs of America (MBDCA), which created obedience venues in which mixed-breed dogs could compete, more opportunities have opened up for all dogs in all dog sports. Most dog agility and fly ball organizations have always allowed mixed-breed dogs to compete. Today, mixed-breeds have proven their worth in many performance sports. 

In conformation shows, where dogs' conformation to a breed standard is evaluated, mixed-breed dogs normally cannot compete. For purebred dogs, their physical characteristics are judged against a single breed standard. This is different in the case of mixed-breed dogs because they are difficult to classify, except for height. There is variation in physical traits such as coat, skeletal structure, gait, ear set, eye shape and color. When conformation standards are applied to mixed-breed dogs, such as in events run by the MBDCA, the standards are usually general traits of health, soundness, symmetry, and personality. 

The Kennel Club (U.K.) operates a show called Scruffts (a name derived from its prestigious Crufts show) open only to mixed-breeds in which dogs are judged on character, health, and temperament. Some kennel clubs, whose purpose is to promote purebred dogs, still exclude mixed-breeds from their performance events. The AKC and the FCI are two such prominent organizations. While the AKC does allow mixed-breed dogs to earn their Canine Good Citizen award, mixed-breed dogs are not permitted to enter AKC "all breed" events, though through their "Canine Partners" program, mixed-breed dogs can be registered to compete in AKC Agility, Obedience, and Rally events.

See also
 Dogs portal
 List of dog breeds
 Free-ranging dog
 Street dog
 Pye-dog
 Rez dog
 Indian pariah dog
 Askal

References

External links 
 

Mongrel
Mixed-breed dogs